This is a list of active NFL broadcasters, including those for each individual team as well as those that have national rights. Unlike the other three major professional sports leagues in the U.S. (Major League Baseball, the NBA and the NHL), all regular-season and post-season games are shown on American television on one of five national networks. Most preseason games are still televised by regional/local broadcasters, with selected preseason games simulcast on national networks.

Background 

All regular-season and postseason games are shown in the U.S. on one of five national networks: the broadcast networks of CBS, Fox, ABC or NBC; or the cable channels ESPN or NFL Network. The league does not, in general, have an anti-siphoning rule for regular season games, and such games can be (and are) carried on both the cable outlet and the local affiliate. Since 2018, selected regular season games airing on NFL Network are also simulcast on Fox. For those regular season games aired exclusively on NFL Network or ESPN, they are also simulcast on a local broadcast station in each of the home markets of the two participating teams (determined by a bidding process). ESPN also airs one postseason game that is also simulcast on their sister national broadcast network ABC; all other postseason games air televised on either CBS, Fox, or NBC. As part of the Sports Broadcasting Act of 1961, the U.S government granted the NFL permission to sell the rights to all regular season and postseason games to the national networks, as an exemption to antitrust laws.

Most preseason games, except a few contests such as the Pro Football Hall of Fame Game, are not televised by the national networks, and the league leaves television rights for those contests up to the individual teams. Most teams produce the games, either themselves or with help from the networks, and set up small syndication networks to carry games throughout the league-designated primary and secondary markets each team serves. The stations that win bidding to locally broadcast cable games are not necessarily the same as the ones who broadcast preseason contests, as the bidding processes are separate; this list is of the preseason broadcasters. In the event that a preseason game does not sell out, the local rightsholder must delay the broadcast a minimum of 24 hours (this rule, along with the rest of the league's blackout policies, was suspended for the 2015 season). NFL Network sometimes simulcasts select preseason games using the feeds of the local broadcast crews. In these cases, the NFL does impose an anti-siphoning rule and does not carry a live game in a particular market if a local station is broadcasting the same game.

On radio, all 32 teams have regional/local syndication networks that carry all preseason, regular season and most postseason games; these are listed here. Radio syndication networks are mostly unrestricted and can be carried anywhere in North America, and several supplemental networks (Compass Media Networks, Sports USA Radio Network) also carry additional Sunday afternoon games outside the home teams' markets. The league's night games are carried both by local networks and by the NFL on Westwood One, a partnership that goes back several decades; the Super Bowl is exclusive to Westwood One, and local broadcasts of that game can only be carried on one flagship station in each team's market.

Regional broadcasters 
The following is a list of local radio and preseason TV broadcasters for each individual team. Four teams, the Arizona Cardinals, the Baltimore Ravens, the Minnesota Vikings, and the New York Giants, do preseason television/radio simulcasts. Some teams like the New England Patriots and the San Francisco 49ers have their regular radio announcers instead call their preseason telecasts, and then have a different announcing team call their preseason radio broadcasts. For the preseason telecasts of many other teams, they may employ announcers who work for the national networks (either NFL or college football games) during the regular season.

Several teams also offer Spanish language broadcasts to serve their Hispanic fan bases.

AFC

AFC East

NFC

NFC East

National broadcasters 
All regular-season and playoff games, as well as some preseason games, are shown in the U.S. on one of the following six national networks. If a regular season game is nationally exclusive on either NFL Network or ESPN games, it is also simulcast on a local broadcast station in each of the home markets of the two participating teams.

Lead national broadcasters 

Note - In the event of a scheduling conflict, NFL Network can also use other NFL personalities.

Other national broadcasters

Spanish national broadcasters 
All regular-season and playoff games, as well as some preseason games, are available in Spanish.

International broadcasters

Worldwide

Americas 

: ESPN, Fox Sports and NFL Sunday Ticket
: CTV, TSN (English) and RDS  (French)
 Latin America (except México and Argentina): ESPN and NFL Sunday Ticket
: ESPN, Fox Sports, TV Azteca Deportes, TelevisaUnivision
Caribbean: ESPN and Verticast

Europe

Africa

Asia

Oceania

See also 
 NFL Network
 NFL Sunday Ticket
 National Football League on television
 List of current Major League Baseball broadcasters
 List of current Major League Soccer broadcasters
 List of current National Basketball Association broadcasters
 List of current National Hockey League broadcasters

Notes

References 

NFL
National Football League broadcasters